Perlič (also spelt Perlich or Perlitch) is a South Slavic surname that is common among Serbians, Croatians, Bosnians, Herzegovinians, and Montenegrins. It is from the South Slavic word perla which is a person who is small and/or highly valued.

Perlich is not to be confused with the Germanic surname Perlich.

External links 
 Meaning of Perlitch

Surnames